Alexander Chappuzeau was a naval officer in the Russian Fleet. He was the eldest son of Jacob Chappuzeau.

Alexander Chappuzeau was aide-de-camp to the famous Count Jean Armand de L'Estocq around 1743 to 1748.

In 1772, his daughter Anna married the famous botanist Samuel Gottlieb Gmelin (1744–1774).
After his death, she married Peter Possiet de Roussier, and their descendants are found in the Stael von Holstein family.

References 

Year of birth missing
Year of death missing
Russian Navy personnel